Pacífico is a station on Line 1 and Line 6 of the Madrid Metro. It is located in Zone A. It has been open to the public since 8 May 1923. On 10 November 1979 it was added to Line 6.

The Nave de motores de Pacífico, an old power station previously used for powering the Metro, is nearby.

References 

Line 1 (Madrid Metro) stations
Line 6 (Madrid Metro) stations
Railway stations in Spain opened in 1923
Buildings and structures in Retiro District, Madrid